Johan David Padilla Quiñónez (born 14 August 1992) is an Ecuadorean footballer who plays as a goalkeeper for Delfín S.C. in the Ecuadorian Serie A and the Ecuador national football team.

Career 
He initially come through at Independiente del Valle where he played for five years. He had a short spell at S.D. Aucas and spelt time on loan at América de Quito in 2017. He joined C.D. El Nacional and played for the team in the Copa Libertadores 2017, the Copa Sudamericana 2018 and the Copa Sudamericana 2019. He signed for Delfin from C.D. El Nacional in October 2020 after he left them on a free transfer after claiming they owed him five months wages.

He made his national team debut on September 11, 2019, in a 3–0 win against Bolivia. He received further caps starting against Colombia and Trinidad and Tobago.

References

External links 
 
 

Living people
1992 births
Ecuadorian footballers
Association football goalkeepers
Ecuador international footballers
C.S.D. Independiente del Valle footballers
Ecuadorian Serie A players
S.D. Aucas footballers
C.D. El Nacional footballers
Delfín S.C. footballers
Sportspeople from Esmeraldas, Ecuador